Maulana Azad Medical College (MAMC) is a medical college in New Delhi, India affiliated to University of Delhi and run by the Delhi government. It is named after Indian freedom fighter and first education minister of independent India Maulana Abul Kalam Azad. It was established in 1959 at Bahadur Shah Zafar Marg near Delhi Gate.

Four hospitals attached to MAMC have a combined bed strength of 2800 beds and cater to millions in Delhi alone and many more from the surrounding states in north India. The college is a tertiary care referral centre and has teaching programs for graduate and postgraduate degrees and residency and subspecialities/fellowships (referred to as superspecialities in India).

History 

The history of Maulana Azad Medical College can be traced to 1936, when India was under British rule. During that time, Indian Medical Service was heavily staffed by the British. In 1940, Martin Melvin Curickshank of the Indian Medical Service (IMS) was appointed Medical Superintendent of Irwin Hospital and Chief Medical Officer of New Delhi. He was appointed specifically to establish a medical college complex near Ramlila Maidan. But before his plans could come to fruition, the Second World War started in 1939 and the plan of a new medical college had to be dropped. Later on in 1958 MAMC made a very humble beginning at the erstwhile Irwin hospital (now the Lok Nayak Hospital). The foundation stone for the new buildings of the college was laid in October 1959 by Govind Ballabh Pant at the 30 acre land of the old Central Jail which was not in use.

Courses offered
Four hospitals – Lok Nayak Jay Prakash Hospital, GB Pant Institute of Postgraduate Medical Education & Research, Maulana Azad Institute of Dental Sciences and Guru Nanak Eye Centre – are situated in the college campus and attached to the college. These make available 2800 beds, 7200 daily outpatient attendance and 47 operation theatres for the patients and for the medical students to learn. It caters to 290 undergraduate students, 245 post graduate and post doctoral students per year being trained by 426 faculty members and 810 resident doctors.

The medical college offers MBBS, BDS and MD and MS degrees and postgraduate residency courses for super-speciality / sub-specialty fellowship degrees of MCh and DM. Institutes offering degrees in nursing and pharmacy are also attached to the college. There are more than 30 courses being offered in MAMC in the Medical Stream. Govind Ballabh Pant Institute of Postgraduate Medical Education and Research, a sister institute, located within the camps provides courses in super specialties and basic subjects. Post Doctoral courses in Pediatric surgery and Neonatology are available at MAMC. Post Doctoral courses in other specialties like GI Surgery, Cardiology etc are available at GB Pant Hospital.

Rankings 

In 2022, MAMC Delhi was ranked 23rd among medical colleges in India by the National Institutional Ranking Framework, 8th by Outlook India among government medical colleges., and 5th among all medical colleges by India Today.

Notable people
 Prem Chandra Dhanda, former principal and Padma Bhushan awardee
 Ravinder Goswami, Shanti Swarup Bhatnagar laureate
 Upendra Kaul, an interventional cardiologist and the winner of a Dr. B. C. Roy Award and Padma Shri
 Kamal Kumar Sethi, former professor and Padma Shri recipient
 Anil Aggrawal, forensic pathologist, editor of Anil Aggrawal's Internet Journal of Forensic Medicine and Toxicology
Prem Aggarwal, cardiologist

Notable alumni
 Karthik Nagesh, neonatologist
 Kshama Metre, pediatrician and rural development official
 Brijendra Kumar Rao, Padma Bhushan in 2009, former chairman of Sir Ganga Ram Hospital, New Delhi and member of Medical Council of India 
 Saumitra Rawat, head of surgical gastroenterology and liver transplants at Sir Ganga Ram Hospital, Padma Shri awardee

Notable faculty
 S. I. Padmavati, former Director MAMC, Padma Vibhushan

Heritage sites
The college was established at the 30 acre land of the old Central Jail which was no longer in use after the establishment of Tihar Jail at far away Tihar village on the fringe of Delhi. The old Central Jail main building is still within the premises of the college and is listed as a heritage site. The grave of the Mughal era poet Momin lies near the parking area near the college. The infamous Khooni Darwaza where Bahadur Shah Zafar's two sons and a grandson were shot by the British in September 1857 during the First war of independence is opposite the main entrance of the college.

References

Universities and colleges in Delhi
Medical colleges in Delhi
Memorials to Abul Kalam Azad
1959 establishments in Delhi
Educational institutions established in 1959